Anthophylax hoffmani is the species of the Lepturinae subfamily in long-horned beetle family. This beetle is distributed in United States. Adult beetle feeds on Fraser fir.

References

Lepturinae